The twelfth season of the American competitive reality television series MasterChef (also known as MasterChef: Back to Win) premiered on Fox on May 25, 2022, and concluded on September 14, 2022. Gordon Ramsay, Aarón Sánchez, and Joe Bastianich all returned as judges.

The season was won by MasterChef Junior season one runner-up Dara Yu, with season five fifth-place finisher Christian Green, and season 10 15th place finisher Michael Silverstein as the runners-up.

Production
On August 18, 2021, it was announced that the series had been renewed for a twelfth season, with judges Ramsay, Sánchez, and Bastianich announced to be returning as well. On April 5, 2022, it was announced that the season would premiere on May 25, 2022.

Contestants 
The season featured 20 returning former MasterChef contestants, including two former MasterChef Junior contestants who competed as adults.

Sources for all contestants and previous seasons: Ages are as shown in graphics on the show.

Elimination table

 (WINNER) This cook won the competition.
 (RUNNER-UP) This cook finished as a runner-up in the finals.
 (WIN) The cook won the individual challenge (Mystery Box Challenge/Skills Test or Elimination Test).
 (WIN) The cook was on the winning team in the Team Challenge and directly advanced to the next round.
 (HIGH) The cook was one of the top entries in the individual challenge but didn't win.
 (HIGH) The cook was one of the top entries in the Team Challenge.
 (IN) The cook wasn't selected as a top or bottom entry in an individual challenge.
 (IN) The cook wasn't selected as a top or bottom entry in a team challenge.
 (IMM) The cook didn't have to compete in that round of the competition and was safe from elimination.
 (IMM) The cook had to compete in that round of the competition but was safe from elimination.
 (LOW) The cook was one of the bottom entries in an individual challenge, and was the last person to advance.
 (LOW) The cook was one of the bottom entries in the Team Challenge and they advanced.
 (ELIM) The cook was eliminated from MasterChef.

Episodes

References

MasterChef (American TV series)
2022 American television seasons